The Gray Man is the debut novel by Mark Greaney, first published in 2009 by Jove Books. It is also the first novel to feature the Gray Man, freelance assassin and former CIA operative Court Gentry.

The novel follows Gentry on a mission across Europe to rescue his handler, Sir Donald Fitzroy, and his family in Normandy, France, from Lloyd, a member of a gigantic French corporation and former CIA officer who wants Gentry terminated in order to shepherd a billion-dollar deal for oil interests in Nigeria, where its president, in turn, wants Gentry dead for the assassination of his brother.

Film adaptation 

There have been several attempts to turn the novel into a film, initially with Christopher McQuarrie attached to direct in 2016. After that version fell through, the project lay dormant until July 2020, when Netflix announced their plans to adapt it. Eventually, it was directed by Joe and Anthony Russo, with Joe Russo also writing the screenplay, and Christopher Markus and Stephen McFeely performing a re-write. Starring Ryan Gosling, Chris Evans, Ana de Armas, Dhanush, Wagner Moura, Julia Butters, and Jessica Henwick, filming commenced in 2021 on a $200 million budget. It was eventually released on July 22, 2022.

References 

The Gray Man
2009 American novels
2009 debut novels
American thriller novels
American novels adapted into films
Jove Books books